Bangladesh Mahila Samiti is a women's organization in Bangladesh descended from the All Pakistan Women's Association that was originally established by Lady Rana Liaquat Ali (wife of the Prime Minister of Pakistan) in 1948. The Dhaka branch was opened in 1949. The organization works to improve awareness of legal issues, and to fund education and health access for women.

References

External links
 Official site

Women's organisations based in Bangladesh
Women's rights in Bangladesh
Women's rights organizations